The MG ZS is a subcompact crossover SUV produced by the Chinese automotive manufacturer SAIC Motor under the British MG marque. Announced at the 2016 Guangzhou Auto Show in China, the MG ZS is the second SUV to be produced under the MG marque after the MG GS. It is positioned below the larger GS or HS, and above the smaller MG 3 hatchback. It is currently the brand's best selling model in international markets.

The vehicle notably revives the name previously used for the MG ZS small family car which was produced by MG Rover between 2001 and 2005. Previously, MG planned to use the name MG XS for the vehicle in the United Kingdom to avoid confusion with the previous MG ZS, but this change of name was reverted shortly after its launch in the country. It was also introduced as the MG Astor in India in September 2021.

Overview
The ZS was launched in China in March 2017 and revealed at the 2017 Auto Shanghai Motor Show. It was also shown at the 2017 London Motor Show for the British market, and launched in Australia later that year. 

At launch, the ZS came in two variants, with the entry-level Soul and flagship Essence. An entry-level Core trim was released in 2018.

In 2020, the ZS was introduced alongside the MG 5 and HS in Mexico, marking the return of the MG marque to the Mexican market after 15 years.

Facelift 
In 2019, the facelifted ZS was revealed in China, it features a redesigned front fascia with new headlamps that are now disconnected from the grille which has been reshaped. At the rear, it gets a new rear bumper and redesigned taillamps. Its updated dashboard now has a larger 10.1 inch infotainment screen.

The facelifted ZS was revealed on 24 March 2020 in Thailand, featuring 1.5-litre SAIC NetBlue Blue Core Power Technology I4 engine, eight speed CVT stepless, along with a package of driver assistance systems, six airbags and a 360-degree view monitor.

On 3 July 2020, the facelifted ZS was launched in the United Kingdom. It was shown to have a revised grille, new LED headlights,  sportier front bumper and new front fog lights.

In September 2020, MG launched the ZS facelift as the MG ZST in Australia. The 'T' letter denotes the newly introduced turbo engine which is a 1.3-litre turbo petrol engine with 6-speed automatic gearbox and MG Pilot safety features.

In September 2021, the facelift version was introduced in India as the MG Astor and will be sold alongside the ZS EV. Several adjustments were made for the Indian market, such as a redesigned grille.

Engines
The ZS has two petrol engines options, an updated SMTC developed version of the naturally aspirated 1.5-litre as found in the MG3, known in this guise as the NSE Plus (formerly just NSE) the updated engine is tuned differently in each market based on locally applicable emission regulations.

In China, for example, the engine is tuned to deliver  and  torque.

The second engine is a new turbocharged three cylinder engine, developed by SAIC in conjunction with General Motors. In China, it produces  and  torque, but in the United Kingdom, it produces  and  torque.

MG EZS/ZS EV
It is available in the United Kingdom, parts of Europe, Thailand, China, India, New Zealand, Australia and Pakistan. Except for China, the electric SUV is officially named as ZS EV, while the official name in China is EZS.

It was revealed in Australia in November 2020 as the cheapest electric car in the market of all time. MG Australia predicted a sales target of 3,000 unit for the 2021 model year.

In fall 2021, a facelift version arrived in Europe; it is scheduled to arrive in the UK in November 2021. Besides styling changes, it is also equipped with a larger, 72.6-kWh battery. At least in some markets, the manufacturer intends to introduce a smaller, 51-kWh battery version later. It was also launched in India on 7 March 2022.

MG VS 
A hybrid electric version was released in Thailand in July 2022 as the MG VS HEV. The VS features a redesigned front fascia and an updated dashboard design adapted from the Chinese market Roewe Lomemo.

Safety 
The MG ZS scored a three star safety rating in the crash tests organised by Euro NCAP in December 2017, while the electric MG EZS received a five star safety rating.

Sales
In 2021 and 2022, the MG ZS was the best-selling small SUV in Australia.

References

External links

 

Production electric cars
ZS
Cars introduced in 2017
2020s cars
Cars of China
Crossover sport utility vehicles
ASEAN NCAP small family cars
Euro NCAP small family cars
Front-wheel-drive vehicles
Vehicles with CVT transmission